Ethylpropyltryptamine  (also known as N-ethyl-N-propyltryptamine or EPT) is a rarely encountered psychedelic substance from the tryptamine class, which makes it structurally related to DMT, MET, DET, and DPT.

Legal status 
 United Kingdom:it's illegal to sell, distribute, supply, transport or trade the pharmaceutical drug under the Psychoactive Substances Act of 2016.
 United States: Is Unscheduled but EPT may be considered an analogue of DMT, which is a Schedule I drug under the Controlled Substances Act. As such, the sale for human consumption could be illegal under the Federal Analogue Act.

References

External links 
 EPT (Isomer Design)

Tryptamines
Designer drugs